Puracé is a town and municipality in the Cauca Department, Colombia.

An 1853 watercolor by Manuel María Paz is an early depiction of four indigenous people in Puracé wearing straw hats and ruanas.

References 

Municipalities of Cauca Department